Pedro J.J. Alvarez is the George R. Brown Professor of Civil and Environmental Engineering at Rice University, where he also serves as Director of the National Science Foundation-sponsored Engineering Research Center on Nanotechnology-Enabled Water Treatment (NEWT).

Born in 1958 in Masaya, Nicaragua, Alvarez received a Jesuit pre-college education at Colegio Centroamerica in Granada, Nicaragua, Externado de San Jose in San Salvador, El Salvador and Colegio del Salvador in Buenos Aires, Argentina.  After graduating from high school at Colegio Centroamerica in Managua, Alvarez obtained a B. Eng. Degree in Civil Engineering from McGill University in Montreal, Canada. He then worked at Tetratech Inc. in Southern California as a project engineer conducting environmental impact studies before attending graduate school at the University of Michigan in Ann Arbor, where he obtained MS. and Ph.D. degrees in Environmental Engineering as a Rackham Fellow. His academic career started at the University of Iowa, Iowa City, where he also served as Associate Director for the Center for Biotechnology and Bioprocessing. 

Alvarez is the 2012 Clarke Prize laureate for outstanding research in water science and technology, and also won the 2014 AAEES Grand Prize for excellence in environmental engineering and science. Past honors include President of the Association of Environmental Engineers (AEESP); the AEESP Frontiers in Research Award, the AEESP Perry L. McCarty Founder’s Award for sustained and outstanding contributions to environmental engineering education and practice; the WEF McKee Medal for Groundwater Protection; the SERDP cleanup project of the year award; the Brown and Caldwell Lifetime Achievement Award for Site Remediation; and various best paper awards with his students. Alvarez has served on the EPA’s Science Advisory Board and the National Science Foundation Engineering Directorate Advisory Committee, and as Associate Editor of Environmental Science and Technology.

Alvarez’s research interests include environmental implications and applications of nanotechnology, bioremediation, fate and transport of toxic chemicals, water footprint of biofuels, water treatment and reuse, and antibiotic resistance control. He was elected to the National Academy of Engineering in recognition for his pedagogical and practical contributions to bioremediation and environmental nanotechnology.

Alvarez is also an honorary professor at Nankai University, Zheijang University, and Chinese Academy of Sciences, and adjunct professor at the Universidade Federal de Santa Catarina in Florianopolis, Brazil.

References

Year of birth missing (living people)
Living people
Rice University faculty
American civil engineers
McGill University Faculty of Engineering alumni
University of Michigan College of Engineering alumni
People educated at Colegio Centro América
Nicaraguan emigrants to the United States
People from Masaya
Fellows of the Association of Environmental Engineering and Science Professors